Opeoluwa Sotonwa (born in Ijebu-Ode) is a Deaf Nigerian American attorney, disability rights advocate and literary writer. In February 2021, Governor Charles Baker appointed Dr. Sotonwa as the Commissioner and agency head for the Massachusetts Commission for the Deaf and Hard of Hearing. Prior to his appointement as Commissioner, he was the Executive Director of Missouri Commission for the Deaf and Hard of Hearing. and served previously as Vice President of the National Black Deaf Advocates, the official advocacy organization for thousands of Black Deaf and Hard of Hearing Americans between 2013 and 2015. He is listed among the most influential Deaf People in the United States
Opeoluwa Sotonwa attended University of Ilorin Nigeria, where he read law and graduated with LLB degree in 2005. He later proceeded to Nigerian Law School for advanced legal training. He was called to the Nigerian Bar as a Barrister and Solicitor of the Supreme Court of Nigeria in 2007. Opeoluwa worked as staff attorney with Nigerian Legal Aid Council. He later moved to United States to further his legal career and attended Howard University School of Law, where he graduated cum laude with a Master of Laws degree in 2009. Dr. Sotonwa earned his doctorate in Law and Policy from Northeastern University's College of Professional Studies in 2018. 

Opeoluwa Sotonwa is the author of The Victim of The Silent Void, published in The Deaf Way II Anthology  by Gallaudet University Press and has been featured prominently in the media.

References

Year of birth missing (living people)
Living people
21st-century Nigerian lawyers
Deaf lawyers
University of Ilorin alumni
Howard University School of Law alumni
Nigerian deaf people
Northeastern University alumni
African-American lawyers
Nigerian Law School alumni
American disability rights activists
African-American activists
African-American writers
Deaf writers
People from Ijebu Ode
20th-century births
Nigerian emigrants to the United States
21st-century African-American people